KKR 25 is an irregular galaxy in the constellation of Draco. It is about 6.4 million light years (1.95 megaparsecs) away from the Earth. KKR 25 is located outside the Local Group but the Local group is the nearest galaxy group with the M81 Group being the second nearest.

See also
Galaxy
List of nearest galaxies

References

Irregular galaxies
Draco